The Chilikadrotna River is a  tributary of the Mulchatna River in the U.S. state of Alaska.

In 1980, the upper  of the river became part of the National Wild and Scenic Rivers System. This segment, rated "wild", lies within the national park.

Recreation
During the months from June to September, the river is generally floatable in  rafts or in kayaks by boaters with the necessary skills. The river also includes some Class I (easy) water. Dangers include overhanging vegetation, logjams, swift current, and a narrow winding course.

Floatfishing is popular on this river, although Alaska Fishing warns that this is "not a river for inexperienced boaters."  There are no formal campgrounds or other accommodations along the river. Game fish on the Chilikadrotna include silver salmon, Arctic grayling, char, rainbow trout, and lake trout.

See also
List of rivers of Alaska

References

External links
Rafting on the Chilikadrotna – National Park Service

Rivers of Lake and Peninsula Borough, Alaska
Rivers of Alaska
Wild and Scenic Rivers of the United States